Natriciteres variegata, the variable marsh snake, is a species of natricine snake found in Guinea, Equatorial Guinea, Ghana, Benin, Togo, Ivory Coast, Nigeria, Cameroon, Central African Republic, Democratic Republic of the Congo, Gabon, Sierra Leone, Burkina Faso, South Sudan, Sudan, and Liberia.

References

Natriciteres
Reptiles described in 1861
Taxa named by Wilhelm Peters